Arie van Os (born 1937) is a Dutch businessman and financial director.

Career
Arie van Os made his fortune as partner of the company Van der Moolen. In the eighties he was the director and chairman of the Amsterdam Stock Exchange, together with his then flamboyant partner Hans Kroon.

In 1989 he became the financial director of AFC Ajax where his reputation grew. He then spent three days in jail due to a tight policy on alleged tax malpractice on behalf of the club with the transfers of Michael Laudrup and Shota Arveladze.

His position at the club was then succeeded by Ajax banker Hein Blocks.

References

External links
 

1937 births
Dutch chief executives
Dutch corporate directors
Businesspeople from Amsterdam
Directors of football clubs in the Netherlands
Living people
Dutch sports executives and administrators